"The Fort Moxie Branch" is a 1988 science fiction short story by Jack McDevitt. It was first published in the 1988 edition of the Full Spectrum anthology series from Bantam Spectra.

Synopsis

A self-published author discovers a transdimensional library that collects the lost works of great authors.

Reception

"The Fort Moxie Branch" was a finalist for the 1988 Nebula Award for Best Short Story and the 1989 Hugo Award for Best Short Story.

Paul J. Nahin has described the librarians' mission as "one that [Ray] Bradbury would surely applaud", while Tom Easton has compared the library to "an Isher weapons shop".

References

External links
Text of the story at Baen.com

Science fiction short stories
1988 short stories